Dominique Méyépa (born 13 October 1972) is a Mauritian  sprinter. He competed in the men's 4 × 100 metres relay at the 1996 Summer Olympics.

References

External links
 

1972 births
Living people
Athletes (track and field) at the 1996 Summer Olympics
Mauritian male sprinters
Olympic athletes of Mauritius
Commonwealth Games competitors for Mauritius
Athletes (track and field) at the 1994 Commonwealth Games
Place of birth missing (living people)